I'm Mahaythi is a 2019 Burmese drama television series. It is based on the eponymous popular novel written by Shin Ma. It aired on MRTV-4, from February 18 to April 18, 2019, on Mondays to Fridays at 20:45 for 43 episodes.

Cast

Main
 Aung Yay Chan as Min Myo Nwe
 Wint Yamone Naing as San Myan
 Than Thar Moe Theint as Main Ma Chaw

Supporting
 Zaw Oo as U Myat Khaung
 May Thinzar Oo as Daw Myat Nwe
 Arr Koe Yar as Mone Mann
 Pyae Thuta Naing as A Nwe Taw
 Zin Myo as U Wai La
 Great Chan
 Moe Thiri Htet
 Eaint Kyi Phyu
 La Won Thit
 Zaw Oo
 Ye Aung
 May Thinzar Oo
 Goon Pone Gyi
 Kaung Htet Thar
 Hein Ya Tu
 Mann Hein
 Khun Seng

References 

Burmese television series
MRTV (TV network) original programming